Heft or HEFT may refer to:

Heart of England NHS Foundation Trust, a health service body in England
Heterogeneous Earliest Finish Time, a scheduling algorithm
High-Energy Focusing Telescope, an experiment in X-ray astronomy
Homestead Extension of Florida's Turnpike, a road in the United States
Heft or hefting, see Glossary of sheep husbandry#G→K

People with the surname Heft
Dolores Heft (born 1934), American actress better known as Dolores Dorn
James Lewis Heft, an American professor
Muhammad Robert Heft (born 1972), Canadian Muslim activist and writer
Robert G. Heft (1941–2009), designer of the 50-star and 51-star versions of the U.S. flag

See also